Chlorodiazepam may refer to:
 Diclazepam, or 2'-Chlorodiazepam, a benzodiazepine designer drug with typical sedative and anxiolytic effects
 Ro5-4864, or 4'-Chlorodiazepam, an atypical benzodiazepine derivative with sedative yet also convulsant and anxiogenic effects